The Saskatchewan Huskies football team represents the University of Saskatchewan in U Sports football that competes in the Canada West Universities Athletic Association conference of U Sports. The program has won the Vanier Cup national championship three times, in 1990, 1996 and 1998. The Huskies became only the second U Sports team to advance to three consecutive Vanier Cup games, after the Saint Mary's Huskies, but lost all three games from 2004-2006. The team has won the most Hardy Trophy titles in Canada West, having won a total of 21 times.

The 2006 Huskies became only the third team to play in a Vanier Cup that their school was hosting, when the University of Saskatchewan hosted the 42nd Vanier Cup. The Toronto Varsity Blues were the first when they won two Vanier Cups in 1965 and 1993. Saskatchewan also became the first western school to host the national championship game.

Recent regular season results

Saskatchewan Huskies in the CFL

As of the end of the 2022 CFL season, nine former Huskies players are on CFL teams' active and practice rosters:
Nathan Cherry, BC Lions
Nick Dheilly, Saskatchewan Roughriders
Josh Hagerty, Toronto Argonauts
Evan Johnson, Saskatchewan Roughriders
Nelson Lokombo, Saskatchewan Roughriders
Patrick Neufeld, Winnipeg Blue Bombers
Riley Pickett, BC Lions
Charlie Power, Calgary Stampeders
Noah Zerr, BC Lions

Award winners

Notable alumni

Gallery

References